Batavier was a Dutch 56-gun fourth-rate ship of the line of the navy of the Admiralty of Amsterdam (one of five provincial navies of the United Provinces of the Netherlands). In 1795 she became part of the Batavian Navy, and on 30 August 1799 was captured by the Royal Navy, who retained her in various subsidiary roles until she was broken up in 1823.

Dutch career and capture
The order to construct the ship was given by the Admiralty of Amsterdam. The ship was laid down on 8 September 1777, launched on 18 February 1779 and commissioned in 1780.
On 5 August 1781, Batavier took part in the Battle of Dogger Bank under Captain Wolter Jan Gerrit Bentinck. She was engaged by three British ships, and became unmanageable after a fire broke out. The battle, while indecisive tactically, resulted in a strategic British victory and afterwards Batavier was towed to Texel. Bentinck later died wounds he received in the battle.
  
In 1795, following the French occupation of the Netherlands during the French Revolutionary Wars, the ship was commissioned in the Batavian Navy.

On 11 October 1797 Batavier took part in the Battle of Camperdown under Captain Jan Jacob Souter. Early in the battle, the ship was under heavy fire, but soon she drifted off, and she eventually left the scene and fled to Texel.

On 30 August 1799 the ship was surrendered to the British fleet under Vice-Admiral Andrew Mitchell during the Vlieter Incident, even though Batavier was the only ship of the Dutch fleet where no mutiny had broken out.

Royal Navy career
Batavier was sailed to Britain and underwent refitting at Chatham Dockyard between 14 July 1800 and 15 July 1801 for use as a floating battery. She was officially established in February 1801. She was commissioned in June 1801 under Captain William Robert Broughton for service in the English Channel. Broughton was succeeded in April 1803 by Captain Patrick Tonyn, and in August 1804 she was laid up at Chatham. She was moved to Woolwich Dockyard in April 1809, where she functioned as a hospital ship under the command of Lieutenant Thomas Dorsett Birchall. This service lasted until January 1817, after which she was moved to Blackwall to receive distressed seamen. Her final service was to be fitted out at Woolwich as a prison ship. She was based at Sheerness from September 1817, and was finally broken up there in March 1823.

Notes

References

 

Ships of the line of the Dutch Republic
Ships of the line of the Batavian Republic
Ships built in Amsterdam
1779 ships
Ships of the line of the Royal Navy